The Cheyenne and Northern Railway was a railroad in the U.S. state of Wyoming.  The railroad was incorporated in 1886 to build a line from Cheyenne, Wyoming into northern Wyoming and Montana.  The line extended  to Wendover on the North Platte River.  It was absorbed by Union Pacific Railroad subsidiary Union Pacific, Denver and Gulf Railway and later became part of the Colorado and Southern Railway when the Union Pacific went into receivership.

History 

The Treaty of Fort Laramie in 1868 closed much of northeastern Wyoming to exploration and settlers.  As a result, the Union Pacific was reluctant to build a line north from Cheyenne.  The defeat of the Sioux in the Great Sioux War of 1876-77 re-opened the region and it was quickly populated by ranchers and settlers.  Throughout the 1870s and 1880s businessmen and politicians in Wyoming petitioned the Union Pacific to build a line to support the growing region.

In 1886 the Wyoming Central Railway, a subsidiary of Fremont, Elkhorn and Missouri Valley Railroad entered eastern Wyoming.  Territorial Governor Francis E. Warren estimated that Wyoming Central shipped $300,000 worth of cattle east through Nebraska instead of Cheyenne.  Due to fears that the lingering dislike for Union Pacific would prevent the passage of a bond, cattleman Thomas Sturgis suggested to Union Pacific that a local company be created to build the line which could then be absorbed into the larger company at a later time.

The Cheyenne and Northern Railway was established in March 1886. The initial investors included Warren, Sturgis and Phillip Dater, first president of the Cheyenne Club. The eventual goal of the railroad was to build all the way north to the Northern Pacific line in Montana but the immediate target was Douglas, Wyoming. In the meantime, the Wyoming Central had reached Douglas. The investors lost interest in continuing north and construction ceased.

Union Pacific took over the line in 1887.  They extended the line slightly to Orin Junction to connect to the Wyoming Central line.  In 1890 Union Pacific created the Union Pacific, Denver and Gulf Railway comprising the Cheyenne and Northern, Colorado Central Railroad, Denver, Texas and Gulf Railroad, and other companies. In 1893 UPD&G went into receivership along with the rest of Union Pacific.  The line was combined with the Denver, Leadville and Gunnison Railway railroad in 1898 to form the Colorado and Southern.  C&S was merged into the Burlington Northern system in 1981.

References 

Defunct Wyoming railroads
Predecessors of the Colorado and Southern Railway
Railway companies established in 1886
Railway companies disestablished in 1890